John Louis Theis (July 23, 1891 – July 6, 1941) was a pitcher in Major League Baseball. He played for the Cincinnati Reds. Theis holds the record shared by many for the lowest ERA in MLB history, having not allowed an earned run in the only game of his career.

He died from a heart attack in 1941 shortly before his 50th birthday.

References

External links

1891 births
1941 deaths
Major League Baseball pitchers
Cincinnati Reds players
Baseball players from Ohio
People from Georgetown, Ohio